Roger Vivian Johnson (born 10 December 1943) is a record-holding 400-meter hurdler who represented New Zealand in the 1968 (Mexico City) and 1972 (Munich) Olympic Games. He also represented New Zealand in the 1966 (Kingston), 1970 (Edinburgh), and 1974 (Christchurch) Commonwealth Games.

Johnson's fastest 400-meter hurdle time of 49.7 was set on 15 April 1972 in Los Angeles. This held the New Zealand record for 42 years, until it was broken by Michael Cochrane in 2014.

Johnson was co-captain of the NCAA Champion UCLA track team in 1967. (alongside Ron Copeland and Tom Jones)

Born in Dunedin, New Zealand, Johnson is the son of Ossie Johnson and Lorna Waddell, also successful athletes (triple-jump and swimming, respectively).

In addition to being an accomplished athlete, Johnson is well respected in the field of operations management. After receiving his PhD from the Graduate School of Management at UCLA in 1973, Johnson joined the faculty of the University of Otago in New Zealand, and was promoted to the dean of commerce from 1976 to 1979. In 1980, Johnson went on to be an associate professor at the UCLA Anderson School of Business, and an associate professor of operations management at the University of Michigan School of Business Administration. His research interests include assembly-line balancing and management, project management, branch-and-bound methods, facility layout, and flexible manufacturing systems. Johnson's work has been published in Management Science, Decision Sciences, and the International Journal of Production Research.

Johnson now resides with his family in Scotland.

References

1943 births
New Zealand male hurdlers
Athletes (track and field) at the 1968 Summer Olympics
Athletes (track and field) at the 1972 Summer Olympics
Olympic athletes of New Zealand
Living people
Athletes (track and field) at the 1966 British Empire and Commonwealth Games
Athletes (track and field) at the 1970 British Commonwealth Games
Athletes (track and field) at the 1974 British Commonwealth Games
Commonwealth Games competitors for New Zealand
Ross School of Business faculty